Seacliff or Sea Cliff or Sea Cliffe may refer to:

Places
Australia
Seacliff, South Australia, suburb of Adelaide
Seacliff Park, South Australia, a suburb of Adelaide
Sea Cliff Bridge, in Illawarra, New South Wales

New Zealand
Seacliff, New Zealand, settlement in Otago, New Zealand
Seacliff Lunatic Asylum, a former mental hospital near the settlement

United Kingdom 
Seacliff, a beach, estate and harbour near North Berwick, Scotland.
Sea Cliffe, Ballure Road, Ramsey, Isle of Man, one of Isle of Man's Registered Buildings

United States
Seacliff, California, a census-designated place near Aptos, California
Seacliff State Beach, a California State Beach in Aptos, California
Sea Cliff, California, a community in Ventura County
Sea Cliff, San Francisco, California, a neighborhood in San Francisco County
Sea Cliff, New York

Ship
DSV Sea Cliff, U.S. Navy research deep submergence vehicle